The 1883 Fordham football team represented Fordham University during the 1883 college football season. The team was led by its first head coach, John F. Condon.

Schedule

References

Fordham
Fordham Rams football seasons
Fordham football